Lak Song station (code BL38) is an elevated MRT Blue Line station opened on 21 September 2019. Station served as a western terminus of the line. The station is located on Phet–Kanchana Junction where Phet Kasem Road intersects Kanchanaphisek Road.

Station details
Lak Song station use side platforms layout. Being a terminal station, only one platform will be use at a time. Trains from Tha Phra entering one of the two platforms before leaving for service back to Tha Phra from the same platform. Unused platform will be blocked off. The station has four exits.

The station bridged to nearby shopping mall The Mall Bang Khae by elevated walkway.

Park and Ride 
Park and Ride at Lak Song station consist of one eight-floor and one ten-floor buildings on both side of Phet Kasem Road. Both buildings are connected via car overpass, allowing cars to enter and exit the building on any side of the road.

References

External links 
 Construction progress from MRTA in Oct. 2013

MRT (Bangkok) stations